St. Mary's University College may mean:

 St. Mary's University College (Belfast), Northern Ireland, UK
 St. Mary's University College, Calgary, Canada
 St. Mary's University College (Twickenham), England, UK (former name of St Mary's University, Twickenham, used until 2014)
 St. Mary's University College (Addis Ababa), Ethiopia
 St. Mary's University College, Dublin

See also:
 Saint Mary's University (disambiguation)
 Saint Mary's College (disambiguation)